The 1987 Indiana State Sycamores football team represented Indiana State University as a member of the Gateway Collegiate Athletic Conference (GCAC) during  the 1987 NCAA Division I-AA football season. The team was led by seventh-year head coach Dennis Raetz and played their home games at Memorial Stadium in Terre Haute, Indiana. The Sycamores finished the season with a 5–6 record overall and a 2–4 record in conference play.

Schedule

References 

Indiana State
Indiana State Sycamores football seasons
Indiana State Sycamores football